This list of churches in  Odsherred Municipality lists church buildings in Odsherred Municipality, Denmark. The municipality is located in the northwestern corner of the island of Zealand.

Overview
Odsherred Municipality belongs to the Diocese of Roskilde, a diocese within the Evangelical Lutheran Church of Denmark. It is divided into 13 parishes. A fourteenth church in the municipality, Vallekilde valgmenighedskirke, is associated with Vallekilde Folk High School.

List

See also
 List of churches in Vordingborg Municipality
 List of churches in Faxe Municipality
 List of churches in Holbæk Municipality

References

External links

 Nordens kirker: Nordvestsjælland

Churches
Odsherred